1839 in sports describes the year's events in world sport.

Boxing
Events
 12 February — William "Bendigo" Thompson defeats James Burke, who is disqualified for head butting.
 Jem Ward finally relinquishes his claim to the English Championship title and awards a championship belt to Bendigo.
 Bendigo suffers a serious knee injury while doing somersaults during a celebration and cannot fight again for several years.
 The English title is again disputed and claims to it are made by Burke, Ben Caunt and Nicholas Ward, brother of Jem Ward.

Cricket
Events
 1 March — formation of Sussex County Cricket Club out of the Sussex Cricket Fund organisation that had been set up in 1836; Sussex is the oldest county club
 10–11 June — Sussex CCC plays its inaugural first-class match versus Marylebone Cricket Club (MCC) at Lord's
England
 Most runs – Ned Wenman 332 @ 18.44 (HS 58)
 Most wickets – James Cobbett 85 (BB 8–?)

Football
Events
 A former Rugby School pupil, Albert Pell, begins organising football matches at Cambridge University.  Because of the different school variations, a compromise set of rules has to be found and this is the origin of the famous Cambridge Rules that will be published in 1863.
 It is claimed that Barnes RFC is founded in 1839 but there is no actual evidence.  If the claim is true, Barnes is the world's oldest football club (all codes).

Horse racing
Events
 The 1839 Grand National is acknowledged to be the first official running of the race, the three earlier races being termed the Great Liverpool Steeplechase
England
 Grand National – Lottery
 1,000 Guineas Stakes – Cara 
 2,000 Guineas Stakes – The Corsair
 The Derby – Bloomsbury
 The Oaks – Deception 
 St. Leger Stakes – Charles XII

Rowing
The Boat Race
 3 April — Cambridge wins the 3rd Oxford and Cambridge Boat Race
Other events
 The first Henley Regatta is held on the River Thames by the town of Henley-on-Thames, England. From 1851 it will be the Henley Royal Regatta.
 The Detroit Boat Club is established on the Detroit River in Michigan. Eventually it will be the oldest sporting club in America.

References

 
Sports by year